The 2018–19 Iowa State Cyclones women's basketball team represents Iowa State University during the 2018–19 NCAA Division I women's basketball season. The Cyclones were coached by Bill Fennelly, who was in his 24th season at Iowa State. They play their home games at Hilton Coliseum in Ames, Iowa as members of the Big 12 Conference. They finished the season 26–9, 13–5 in Big 12 play to finish in second place. They advanced to the championship game of the Big 12 women's tournament where they lost to Baylor. They received at-large bid of the NCAA women's tournament defeated New Mexico State in the first round before getting upset by Missouri State in the second round.

Previous season
The Cyclones finished the 2017–18 season 14–17, 7–11 in Big 12 play to finish in a tie for seventh place. They advanced to the quarterfinals of the Big 12 women's tournament where they lost to Texas.

Offseason

Departures

2018 team recruits

Roster

Schedule and results

|-
!colspan=12 style=| Exhibition

|-
!colspan=12 style=| Non-conference regular season

|-
!colspan=12 style=| Big 12 Conference Season

|-
!colspan=12 style=| Big 12 Tournament

|-
!colspan=12 style=| NCAA Women's Tournament

Rankings

^Coaches' Poll did not release a second poll at the same time as the AP.

Awards and honors

See also
2018–19 Iowa State Cyclones men's basketball team

References

Iowa State Cyclones women's basketball seasons
Iowa State
Iowa State Cyc
Iowa State Cyc
Iowa State